Harald Koch (born 14 February 1969) is a retired Austrian badminton player from Askö Traun badminton club. He is the brother of former Olympian badminton player Jürgen Koch.

About 
Harald and his younger brother Jürgen Koch were born in badminton enthusiast family. Their father Herbert Koch served as the manager of Askö Traun, Austrian youth committee and as OÖBV president; and led their team in winning the Bundesliga title many times. Harald Koch won his first national title at the national junior championships in 1987. In 1991 he won the senior competition for the first time. Since then, he has won Austrian national championships for 26 times. Internationally, Harald has won titles in European grand prix, which includes his titles in Czechoslovakia, Slovakia, Romania and France and several other runner-up performances as well in Slovenia, Hungary, Austria and Croatia. At present, he is working as a Sporting goods dealer.

Achievements

IBF International 
Men's doubles

References

External links 
 
 

1969 births
Living people
Austrian male badminton players
People from Traun
Sportspeople from Upper Austria